The eighth edition of the Copa América de Ciclismo was held on January 6, 2008. The 2008 edition was not staged in São Paulo, Brazil, but in a street circuit around Flamengo Park, in Rio de Janeiro.

Results

References 
 cyclingnews

Copa América de Ciclismo
Copa
Copa
January 2008 sports events in South America